Mikulovice is a municipality and village in Jeseník District in the Olomouc Region of the Czech Republic. It has about 2,500 inhabitants.

Administrative parts
Villages of Kolnovice and Široký Brod are administrative parts of Mikulovice.

Geography
It is located on the border with Poland.

Mikulovice lies in the valley of the Bělá River. The Olešnice flows to the Bělá in the village. The municipality is located in the Zlatohorská Highlands.

History
The first written mention of Mikulovice is from 1263. It was founded in the 13th century, during the colonization by the bishops of Wrocław, who owned the area.

Mikulovice became part of the Duchy of Nysa, which later on passed under Bohemian suzerainty, and following the duchy's dissolution in 1850, it was incorporated directly into Bohemia. Following World War I, from 1918, it formed part of Czechoslovakia.

From 1938 to 1945 it was occupied by Germany as part of the so-called Sudetenland. During World War II, the Germans operated several forced labour subcamps of the Stalag VIII-B/344 prisoner-of-war camp in the village.

In 1907 Mikulovice became a market town, but lost the title during the reformation in 1949.

Twin towns – sister cities

Mikulovice is twinned with:
 Głuchołazy, Poland
 Pakosławice, Poland

See also
Muna (Mikulovice)

References

External links

Villages in Jeseník District
Czech Silesia